Neville MacKenzie Farmer (born 17 January 1960) is a British music, television and film producer, composer, performer and music industry commentator. His plethora of published materials include articles, scripts, books, films, plays, songs, events and art; all of which have captured moments large and small, insignificant and epic through lateral thought, clarity and insight.

Life and career
His TV and music production work began in 1989, when he both scripted and announced the first World Music Awards from Monte Carlo, a large and prestigious event that honours both performers and music industry achievers.  For the next 14 years he served as executive musical director to Pilot Film and Television,Pilot Film and Television Productions a London-based production company that creates and distributes multiple-award-winning independent television programs, including Lonely Planet, Globetrekker and Treks in a Wild World, for whom he produced over 100 episodes. This led to the successful Globe Trekker CD series, collection of numerous CDs available worldwide.  Each CD features contributions from numerous artists, including Emmy Award winner Martyn Swain, Roger Waters' producer Ian Ritchie, and Grammy Award nominated Simon Emmerson.

Neville Farmer earned his expertise in combining different musical cultures through some years working for Peter Gabriel's Real World Group, which publishes some of his music. His other musical collaborations have included Robert Plant, XTC, Nigel Kennedy, Andy Fairweather Low, Dave Edmunds, John Otway, Robbie Blunt, Deni Bonet, Ayub Ogada, Douglas Pashley, Richard Horowitz, Richard Niles, Ian Carr, and Karl Wallinger.

In 2012, he co-composed and produced the motion picture soundtrack of the multi-award-winning Western movie, West Of Thunder for the Sunka Wakan Dragonfly Film Studio. In 2013, he co-composed the soundtrack of Wounded: The Battle Back Home: Angela Peacock’s Story for MSNBC. This subsequently led to his producing Kevin Brown's 13th album, Grit in 2015.

As a film and television producer, writer and director, Farmer has credits on films and series broadcast in over 50 countries. He was series producer of Globe Trekker's 9th and 10th series, both of which won the Canadian Television Award for Excellence In Programming, He was Series Producer of Planet Food's 2nd series for The Food Network and BBC2, as well as Edit Producer on series 1 and Producer of the Southern China and Malaysia shows, which he also scripted. Between 1995 and 2000, He directed over 20 short films for The Sundance Channel, including “24 Frame News” and “Anatomy of A Scene” interviews with directors and screenwriters such as Ken Russell, Kim Longinotto, Nick Hornby and Marc Forster. He has been Series Producer for a wide range of independent productions, including “Paranormal Egypt” for The History Channel and “Adventure Golf” for The Discovery Channel. He wrote, produced and directed “Lighting Up Lives” a short film for Sunderland AFC's World Cup bid and music videos for the Australian blues guitarist, Gwyn Ashton. He was edit producer of the 2014 ITN Production, Virgin Killer (Channel 4 UK) Campus Killer (A&E (TV channel) USA), He has also co-written screenplays, Messiah with Irish/American director, Marion Comer and The Inventor with American film producer/director, Jody Marriott Bar-Lev.

Farmer's theatrical work has included producing the music for the London stage show, Stormforce, " which successfully blended Irish and African rhythms, and both writing and producing the play "The Devil's Interval" about the composer, George Frideric Handel and rock guitarist, Jimi Hendrix. In 2014, the actor and impresario Richard Strange asked Neville to co-produce and direct a film of Strange's multi-media theatrical tribute to William S Burroughs, “Language Is a Virus From Outer Space”.

As a writer on music and the music industry, Farmer has been employed by Beatles producer, Sir George Martin, Peter Gabriel, Andy Partridge, the Bert Kaempfert Organisation, Abbey Road Studios and international publications such as Billboard, Music Week, Pro Sound News and Mix Magazine. His books include the history of German composer, Bert Kaempfert for the Songwriters Hall of Fame Museum in New York, and XTC – Song Stories, the story of the music of British cult band XTC, for Disney's Hyperion Books. He has written on many subjects, including history, architecture, politics, food, horticulture, travel and religion.

“There is nothing like a bespoke, composed soundtrack to lift a film or television production. Off-the-peg library music may appear to be cheaper than commissioning your own music, but it is often a false economy.”

Executive producer and recording credits
 Grit – Kevin Brown, 2015 – producer
 West Of Thunder – the Original Motion Picture Soundtrack – The Fishkillers, 2013 – co-composer, lead vocalist, musician, co-producer
 Late Developer – Suzanne Rhatigan, 2012 – backing vocalist
 Mermaids Live Inside – Jacqueline Kroft, 2011 – producer
 Globe Jam – various artists, 2008 – executive producer
 Metropolis – various artists, 2008 – executive producer
 Globe Trekker Latin American Journeys – various artists, 2005 – executive producer
 Globe Trekker Asian Journeys – various artists, 2005 – executive producer
 More Music From The Lonely Planet – various artists, 2003 – executive producer
 Globe Trekker Original Journeys – various artists, 2003 – executive producer
 Music From The Lonely Planet – various artists, 2002 – executive producer
 Globe Trekker Volume 2 – various artists, 2002 – executive producer
 Globe Trekker Ambient Journeys – various artists, 2002 – executive producer
 Globe Trekker Volume 1 – various artists, 2001 – executive producer
 Lifting The Veil – Susanne Bramson, 1998 – producer
 Books Are Burning – Nonsuch – XTC, 1992 – backing vocalist
 Poor Skeleton Steps Out – Oranges And Lemons – XTC, 1989 – backing vocalist
 Bags of Fun With Buster – Single, 1987 – co-composer, backing vocalist with Andy Partridge, David Gregory, and John Otway
 Take Good Care of Your Soul – Real World Presents – various artists – co-composer, backing vocalist
 Look What You've Done to My Skin – The Passion of Darkly Noon Film Soundtrack (demo version) – Nic Bicat – lead vocalist

Television and film music credits
 Wounded: The Battle Back Home: Angela Peacock’s Story – MSNBC – co-composer, producer
 West of Thunder - feature-length movie –  co-composer, performer, producer 
 The World Music Awards – seasons 1–5 – Marcor International / ABC TV – scriptwriter / announcer
 Lonely Planet – seasons 1–12 – Pilot Productions – musical director
 Treks in a Wild World – seasons 1–4 (2000–2008) – Pilot Productions – musical director
 Into Africa – Wall To Wall Television – music producer
 Supertwins – Wall To Wall Television – music producer
 Into The Fire – Wall To Wall Television – music producer
 Grand Designs – Season 2 – Talkback Thames Productions
 Jesus in the Himalayas – National Geographic (2001) – musical director
 Lost Worlds – The Discovery Channel – musical director
 Adventure Golf – Seasons 1–2 (2010) – Pilot Productions – musical director
 Planet Food – Seasons 1–3 – Pilot Productions (2009–2011) – musical director

Television and film production credits
 The World Music Awards – seasons 1–5 – Marcor International / ABC TV – scriptwriter / announcer
 Globe Trekker – seasons 9–10 – Pilot Productions – series producer, writer
 Adventure Golf – season 2 – Pilot Productions – series producer, producer, writer
 Planet Food – season 2 – Pilot Productions – series producer, producer, writer
 Paranormal Egypt – Ruggie Media – series producer
 Virgin Killer – ITN Productions – edit producer, writer
 Lighting Up Lives – DAYtime Entertainment – producer director 
 Language Is A Virus From Outer Space – Richard Strange Productions – producer, director
 The Inventor – Sunka Wakan Dragonfly Film Studios – screenwriter
 Little Girl and Sensitive Kind – Gwyn Ashton music videos – producer director

References

1960 births
Living people
Place of birth missing (living people)
British television producers
British record producers
British film producers
British composers
Writers about music